The Musée de la Défense aérienne is an aviation museum in La Baie, Quebec. The museum holds a collection of nine military aircraft. It is one of four aviation museums in Quebec, along with Vintage Wings of Canada in Gatineau, the Montreal Aviation Museum in Sainte-Anne-de-Bellevue, and the Quebec Aerospace Museum in Saint-Hubert.

History 
The Musée de la Défense aérienne was founded in 1997. It is located on the grounds of CFB Bagotville. Visitors can tour RCAF 3 Wing as part of their visit. Along with the permanent collection of planes (which is located outside), the museum also has a rotating exhibit in its building.

Collection

Airplanes

Helicopters

See also
List of aviation museums

References 

Aerospace museums in Quebec
Aviation history of Canada
Military and war museums in Canada
Museums established in 1997
1997 establishments in Quebec